Thick in the South: Soul Gestures in Southern Blue, Vol. 1 is an album by Wynton Marsalis that was released in 1991. Part one of the blues cycle was recorded by Marsalis and his quintet with guest appearances by Joe Henderson and Elvin Jones.

Reception
The AllMusic reviewer indicated that this was the strongest of the three Soul Gestures in Southern Blue albums, but that Marsalis's "five compositions lack any memorable melodies and his own virtuosic solos do not have any distinctive qualities". The Billboard reviewer of all three volumes of Soul Gestures in Southern Blue commented on their "atmosphere of politeness, an absence of swing, and a somewhat shocking lack of true blues feeling".

Track listing

 Track listing adapted from AllMusic.

Personnel
 Wynton Marsalis – trumpet
 Joe Henderson – tenor saxophone
 Marcus Roberts – piano
 Robert Hurst – double bass
 Elvin Jones – drums
 Jeff "Tain" Watts – drums

Production
 George Butler – executive producer
 Steven Epstein – producer
 Dennis Ferrante – engineer
 Tim Geelan – engineer
 Stanley Crouch – liner notes

References

1991 albums
Columbia Records albums
Wynton Marsalis albums
albums produced by George Butler (record producer)